Canadian Association for Repeal of the Abortion Law (CARAL) was a coalition of abortion rights activists, created in 1974, to protest the incarceration of Dr. Henry Morgentaler, who was jailed for providing safe, yet not legalized, abortions in Canada. The organization later changed its name to the Canadian Abortion Rights Action League (Association Canadienne pour le Droit d'Avortement) (CARAL/ACDA).

History 
Canadian Abortion Rights Action League was founded on June 20, 1973, in Toronto, by abortion rights activists June Callwood, Kay Macpherson, Lorna Grant, Eleanor Wright Pelrine, Esther Greenglass, and Henry Morgentaler. On November 19, 1974, the group founded the Canadian Abortion Rights Action League in Ottawa. Ed Ratcliffe of London, Ontario, was its president. Among the founding members were Norma Scarborough (d. 2 April 2009), and Eleanor Wright Pelrine. A youthful experience affected Scarborough's attitude towards abortion. When she was a member of the Canadian Women's Army Corps in the 1940s, Scarborough found a colleague bleeding to death in barracks without medical attention. The woman was afraid to call for help because she had undergone an illegal abortion. Norma arrived too late: the woman bled to death. Her experience gave her a firm conviction that abortion should be legal.

The aim of CARAL was to legalize abortion in Canada. To accomplish their aim, they supported Dr. Henry Morgentaler's challenge of the 1969 abortion law, which required the approval of a hospital's Therapeutic Abortion Committee (TAC) before an abortion could be legally performed (without requiring TACs to be formed or to meet). Fewer than one-third of hospitals had TACs and some TACs existed on paper but never met.

In 1980, CARAL changed its name to the Canadian Abortion Rights Action League. In 1982, it separated education and research arm as the "Childbirth by Choice Trust".

CARAL formed provincial and local chapters across Canada. In July 1983, it set up the Pro-Choice Defence Fund and helped to raise funds for Morgentaler's legal fees. Their charter is to assure that no woman is denied the right to a safe, legal abortion and to gain recognition that the right to a safe, legal abortion is a fundamental human right. Another reason that they supported Dr. Morgentaler was that the technique he developed, vacuum curettage, was safer and less invasive than the traditional dilation and curettage (D&C) that was traditionally performed at hospitals for abortions or after miscarriages. The development of non-surgical medical abortion for very early pregnancies has reduced maternal mortality still further.

In 1984, CARAL incorporated as a non-profit organization. It was run by a volunteer board of directors and held annual general meetings each spring. The national office stayed in Ottawa. CARAL described itself as  the only national abortion rights organization in Canada. In 1991, it had 36 chapters across the country with over 18,000 members. As its aim was to influence legislation, CARAL had no charitable status and relied entirely on private donations. It focused on keeping abortion legal and on improving access to birth control and abortion services. It lobbied federal and provincial legislators, asked governments to fund clinics, and published and spoke about abortion issues. It also supported the local chapters and medical doctors who provide abortion services.

In 2003, CARAL published a major study of access to abortion in Canada. The study found that only one hospital in six performs abortions and that ready access to abortion is found mainly in large cities and in a narrow strip of more densely populated land near the U.S. border.

In 2004 CARAL wrapped up operations and was effectively replaced in 2005 by the Abortion Rights Coalition of Canada/Coalition pour le Droit à l'Avortement au Canada (ARCC-CDAC) and a reproductive health resource group, Canadians for Choice (CFC).

The sister organization of CARAL, the National Association for the Repeal of Abortion Laws, was founded and still operates in the United States.

Archives 
There is a Canadian Abortion Rights Action League fond at Library and Archives Canada. The archival reference number is R3420, former archival reference number MG28-I453. The fond contains archival material ranging from 1974 to 2003. It includes 11.97 meters of textual records; 2 photographs; and 1 16mm film.

External links
 Childbirth by Choice archives (the research arm of CARAL) are located at the Clara Thomas Archives & Special Collections, York University Libraries, Toronto, Ontario.

References

Medical and health organizations based in Ontario
Abortion in Canada